Harlan Kenneth Ullman (born March 15, 1941), is Chairman of the Killowen Group that advises leaders of government and business; Chairman of CNIGuard Ltd and CNIGuard Inc, engaged in protection of critical infrastructure; Senior Advisor of the Atlantic Council in Washington, DC; and active on a number of private boards. A former naval officer, he has commanded destroyers as well as Swift Boats in Vietnam in over 150 combat patrols and actions. He was the principal author of the "shock and awe" doctrine.

Biography
He graduated from the U.S. Naval Academy in 1963. He holds MA, MALD, and Ph.D. from The Fletcher School at Tufts University.

In 2007, Ullman was outed as a client of the DC Madam, who also described him as an "unpleasant person."

He currently chairs the Killowen Group and CNIGuard PLC, in the infrastructure protection sector; is Senior Advisor at the Atlantic Council; Arnaud de Borchgrave Distinguished UPI Columnist and also served as a Presidential Fellow at Polytechnic University of New York.

Theories

Ullman was the principal author of the doctrine of "shock and awe" that was a product of the National Defense University of the United States. This concept is technically known as "rapid dominance" and is a military doctrine based on the use of "overwhelming decisive force," "dominant battlefield awareness," "dominant maneuvers," and "spectacular displays of power" to "paralyze" an adversary's perception of the battlefield and destroy his will to fight. 

He additionally theorized that Russia would never invade Ukraine, but was later proven wrong within 2 weeks.

Bibliography

Books
 In Harm's Way: American Seapower and the 21st Century by Harlan K. Ullman, 1991, Bartleby Press, 
 Shock and Awe - Achieving Rapid Dominance, Harlan K. Ullman and James P. Wade, with L.A. "Bud" Edney, Fred M. Franks, Charles A. Horner, and Jonathan T. Howe, 1996, National Defense University, reprint edition 2008: Forgotten Books 
 Unfinished Business: Afghanistan, the Middle East, and Beyond—Defusing the Dangers That Threaten America's Security by Harlan Ullman, foreword by John S. McCain, Citadel, 2002 
 Owls and Eagles: Ending the Foreign Policy Flights of Fancy of Hawks, Doves, and Neo-Cons, 2005, Rowman & Littlefield Publishers, 
 America's Promise Restored: Preventing Culture, Crusade, and Partisanship from Wrecking Our Nation by Harlan Ullman, 2006, Carroll & Graf, 
 A Handful of Bullets: How the Murder of Archduke Franz Ferdinand Still Menace the Peace, 2014, Naval Institute Press, 
 
 The Fifth Horseman and the New MAD, 2022, Post Hill Press,

Critical studies and reviews of Ullman's work 
Anatomy of failure

References

External links
 
 
 
 Harlan Ullman's presentation at the Pritzker Military Museum & Library
 

1941 births
Living people
United States Naval Academy alumni
United States Navy officers
The Fletcher School at Tufts University alumni
American male writers
Polytechnic Institute of New York University faculty